The Dynasty Tour was a concert tour by the rock band Kiss.

Background

The Dynasty Tour, also known as "The Return of Kiss", was the first tour to feature the famous flying stunt by Gene Simmons. This was also the first tour to feature Ace Frehley's "lighted guitar" and his rocket-shooting guitar, where after his smoke-spewing guitar solo, the still-smoking guitar would float up. As it was floating upward, he would appear with another guitar, aim the neck at the floating guitar, shoot the rockets, and blow it up. John Elder Robison, who served as a technician for the band during the late 1970's, documented the lengths he went to create the elaborate effects for the tour. A trick was designed for Paul Stanley that involved his putting on a headset and shooting a laser out of his left eye to mock the effect seen in Kiss Meets the Phantom of the Park the year before. After several runthroughs, both Stanley and manager Bill Aucoin nixed the idea, citing the danger involved.

The tour, dubbed "The Return Of Kiss", also saw a decline in audience. Additional dates at the Pontiac Silverdome were cancelled. Reviews and recordings have confirmed the tour was also of poor musical quality. This was the last tour with Peter Criss on drums until 1996. He would later admit he would intentionally stop playing during shows just to upset the rest of the band.

This tour is also famous for being the only tour to feature songs from all four members’ solo albums. Simmons performed "Radioactive", Criss performed "Tossin' and Turnin'", Frehley performed "New York Groove", and Stanley performed "Move On". Simmons' and Criss' songs were replaced with more familiar songs early in the tour. Criss' song "Dirty Livin" was reportedly rehearsed, but never performed.

Frehley stated in various interviews that Kiss was becoming a youth-oriented band. It was because kids were showing up dressed in costume and make-up for their shows along with their parents.

In the tour program for the band's final tour, Stanley reflected on the tour:

Reception
Roman Kozak from Billboard opened his review, stating that there was nothing quite like a Kiss concert. He noted on the addition of audiences who were in their preteens and teens, adding that they were quite pleased by the extravagant performance. Kozak pointed out that while the band had done little to its basic formula, they played a "thunderous heavy metal music" and said they were as good as they needed to be, in which there was hardly a dull moment with the usage of special effects, as well as the new addition of Gene Simmons levitating  to the top of the lighting truss, which had impressed the audience.

Setlist

Typical setlist
 "King of the Night Time World"
 "Let Me Go, Rock 'n' Roll"
 "Move On"
 "Calling Dr. Love"
 "Firehouse"
 "New York Groove"
 "I Was Made for Lovin' You"
 "Christine Sixteen"
 "2,000 Man"
 "Love Gun"
 "God of Thunder"
 "Shout It Out Loud"
 "Black Diamond"
Encore
 "Detroit Rock City"
 "Beth"
 "Rock and Roll All Nite"

Early tour setlist
 "King of the Night Time World"
 "Radioactive"
 "Move On"
 "Calling Dr. Love"
 "Firehouse"
 "New York Groove"
 "I Was Made for Lovin' You"
 "Love Gun"
 "2,000 Man"
 "Tossin' and Turnin'"
 "God of Thunder"
 "Shout It Out Loud"
 "Black Diamond"
Encore
 "Detroit Rock City"
 "Beth"
 "Rock and Roll All Nite"

Tour dates

Cancelled dates

Box office score data

Personnel
Paul Stanley – vocals, rhythm guitar
Gene Simmons – vocals, bass
Peter Criss – drums, vocals
Ace Frehley – lead guitar, vocals

References

Sources

External links
 The official Kiss website

Kiss (band) concert tours
1979 concert tours